In algebraic topology, a transgression map is a way to transfer cohomology classes.
It occurs, for example in the inflation-restriction exact sequence in group cohomology, and in integration in fibers. It also naturally arises in many spectral sequences; see spectral sequence#Edge maps and transgressions.

Inflation-restriction exact sequence 

The transgression map appears in the inflation-restriction exact sequence, an exact sequence occurring in group cohomology.  Let G be a group, N a normal subgroup, and A an abelian group which is equipped with an action of G, i.e., a homomorphism from G to the automorphism group of A. The quotient group  acts on 

 

Then the inflation-restriction exact sequence is:

The transgression map is the map .

Transgression is defined for general , 

,

References

External links 

Homological algebra
Algebraic topology